Liquid lunch may refer to:

 "Liquid Lunch", a 2013 song by Caro Emerald
 "Liquid Lunch", an episode of Archer (season 7)

See also
 Drunkorexia, a colloquialism for self-imposed starvation or binge eating/purging combined with alcohol abuse
 Soup, a primarily liquid food
 Liquid diet
 Three-martini lunch, a leisurely, indulgent lunch enjoyed by businesspeople or lawyers